CFRV-FM (107.7 FM) is a radio station licensed to Lethbridge, Alberta. Owned by Rogers Sports & Media, the station broadcasts an adult contemporary format branded as KiSS 107.7.

History
The station first signed on the air on August 28, 1959 at 100.9 FM under its original call letters CHEC-FM. The station's call letters were changed to CILA in 1979 and increased its power to 100,000 watts. In 1980, the station moved to its current frequency. In 1992, the station adopted its current call letters. The station had a hot adult contemporary format until 2007 when the station shifted to adult contemporary, the station's format change to adult contemporary occurred around the same time CJBZ-FM shifted from adult hits to CHR/Top 40. This format change was to compete against rival station CJOC-FM.

This makes Lethbridge the largest Alberta market without a hot adult contemporary station, having been overtaken from Edmonton in February 2010, virtually the same time when CKNO-FM signed on the air. The station has since moved back to a hot AC sound. The station's branding at the time was 107.7 The River. On September 2, 2016, CFRV rebranded to KiSS 107.7, with no change in format.

External links
 
 
 

Frv
Frv
Frv
Radio stations established in 1959
1959 establishments in Alberta